The Swiss International is an open international badminton tournament in Switzerland, established since 2011. This tournament was held for the first time from 20 to 23 October 2011 in Bern, then in 2012-2016 held in Yverdon-les-Bains.

Previous winners

References 
2016
2015

Recurring sporting events established in 2011
Badminton tournaments in Switzerland